School of Architecture and Planning may refer to:

Anna University School of Architecture and Planning
Catholic University School of Architecture and Planning
MIT School of Architecture and Planning
University of the Witwatersrand School of Architecture & Planning

See also
 School of Planning and Architecture (India)
 College of Architecture and Planning (disambiguation)